The Overland Route is a route to Australia and East Asia. The route crosses the European continent. It was inaugurated by Thomas Fletcher Waghorn in 1845, and was modified on the opening of the Suez Canal in 1869. The route now crosses the following locations:
France
The Mont Cenis tunnel
Brindisi
The Levant
Suez Canal
The Red Sea
The Indian Ocean.

Trade routes